"Just a Little While" is a song by American recording artist Janet Jackson, released as the lead single from her eighth studio album, Damita Jo (2004). Written by Jackson and Dallas Austin, the song is a reflection of Jackson's new-found happiness. The song leaked ahead of its scheduled release, causing Jackson's record company to rush with a music video and promotion. It was released the day following Jackson's controversial Super Bowl Halftime Show performance incident, on February 2, 2004, as the lead single from Damita Jo.

"Just a Little While" received favorable reception from critics, who felt it would become successful. However, following the Super Bowl incident, Jackson's singles and music videos were blacklisted on many radio formats and music channels worldwide, affecting the song's performance. Although its success in the US was limited, peaking at number 45 on the Billboard Hot 100, it peaked atop the Hot Dance Club Songs chart. Internationally, it was more successful, reaching the top ten in Belgium, Canada, and Spain and the top twenty in Australia and the United Kingdom. It peaked at number one in Japan for five weeks, and was the year's second-biggest hit on Japan's international airplay chart.

The song's music video, directed by Dave Meyers, was released exclusively in international territories due to the controversy surrounding Jackson at the time. It portrays Jackson filming a DVD for her boyfriend in a futuristic apartment setting, displaying her multiple personae. An alternate live video, filmed in London, was included on Jackson's From janet. to Damita Jo compilation. Jackson performed the song on television shows including Top of the Pops, Hey! Hey! Hey!, and Festivalbar.

Background and release
After experiencing substantial worldwide success with All for You (2001), Jackson considered pursuing other career plans, but then decided to record a new album. Jackson recorded "Just a Little While" with producer Dallas Austin, describing it as a "happy, up, fun song". She had initially planned to revamp the album with Austin, also recording "Sexhibition" and unreleased songs such as "If You Want Me To" and "Let it Go". Austin declared Jackson "the easiest artist I've worked with", adding, "Guys won't know what to do with themselves after this. It's one of the best records she's made." Austin added:
"People like Janet's songs because they get to hear what Janet's going through. . . Janet's in a really good space right now. She's in love. The thing is, some people think you can't do good stuff when you're happy. [...] People don't want to hear "Get out of here!" and "You did this to me!" all day long. Everybody wants to feel good. So we tapped into her happiness".

The lead single from Jackson's eighth studio album Damita Jo had no release date announced until a song titled "Just a Little While" leaked ahead of schedule in January, disrupting plans for its release and promotion. Regarding the leak, Jackson commented, "it really does affect artists and hurts the initial launch of a project. Its like there's a monkey wrench in your whole game plan". The leak prompted Virgin Records to digitally deliver the song to radio outlets, announcing its release for the morning after Jackson's Super Bowl XXXVIII Halftime Show performance on February 2, 2004. The song was released as a CD single in Australia on March 15, 2004, while in the United Kingdom, it was released on April 12, 2004, as two CD singles and a 12-inch vinyl single.

Composition

"Just a Little While" is a pop, dance and new wave song, written by Jackson and Dallas Austin, and produced by Austin. It features former Danger Danger guitarist Tony Reyes. Jackson stated, "it's a very poppy song with a lot of guitar. It's a happy, up, fun song." It opens with funk guitars before it transitions into uptempo pop rock. Jackson blends carnal desires with innocence, longing to be intimate with her partner again: "Can't stop thinking about the things we do / And how it feels making love to you / You know I'll take it anywhere / That you wanna go right now / Just love me for a little while." As described by The Scotsman, the song is regarded as "a pop single that buries its dirty intentions under a catchy melody."

In addition to the original, an international version known as the "UK Radio Edit" uses an alternate instrumental, replacing guitars with synthesizers, drums, and electronic beats. A newly recorded urban remix with an alternate instrumental, vocals, and revised lyrics was produced by Just Blaze and titled "Love Me". The remix was later included on a promotional Japanese vinyl along with "Speed it Up (Put It on Me)", a Damita Jo outtake produced by Rich Harrison used during auditions for the album's promotional tour.

Critical reception

"Just a Little While" received mostly positive reviews from critics, who praised its contrast from Jackson's general style. Billboard, predicting the song to be "another immediate radio hit," commended the "festive, guitar-based" song, stating, "Janet Jackson knows how to make a great single." Billboard added that the song showcases Jackson's "signature fashion" of crafting lyrics which appeared "innocent on the surface yet naughty upon closer inspection." Rolling Stone considered it "push-button rock & roll", while The Record praised its "fun, loose production." Eric R. Danton of The Courant said the track "features a discernible melody, a catchy vocal hook, a prominent, up-tempo guitar riff that helps the tune stand out from the dross." Rich Juzwiak of The Village Voice declared it "her virgin/whore-iest moment yet", in addition to Jackson's "most self-sufficient" single. Juzwiak wrote, "Forget about ripping off clothes—Janet Jackson just wants a zipless fuck," adding "like a moth to a flame is Janet's hand to her strawberry (her words!). She's so eager to please that even if the quickie she solicits in the chorus doesn't go down, she'll "touch it on [her] favorite fruit" anyway."

Stephen Thomas Erlewine called it "a good dance tune", while BBC UK compared it to the "quintessential Janet" of "Whoops Now". The Scotsman said it "trumped" other songs on Damita Jo, adding, "Already a sizeable download hit, it is likely to hang around the charts and our heads for a while." The Hot Press predicted the "rock-oriented" single to "hit the number one spot within days of its release." Spence D. of IGN called it "a most bizarre flip", praising Jackson for "unleashing an upbeat, rock infused number" of the "alternapop" genre. It was also commended for its "raking guitar chords that propel the song along." The New York Times qualified it as "a playful new-wave song". Entertainment Weekly exclaimed its "skittish, pared-down guitar opening" to be "fresh and surprising", evoking a vibe "sexier than her Matrix Super Bowl Revolutions outfit." Tom Moon described it to contain "that primal quality that gets people moving before they can even process the message." The Ottawa Sun wrote, "the album's most interesting, and energetic moment, is saved for the final track, Just a Little While, where there's some actual electric guitar near the front of the mix."

Adversely, Slant called it "a rare misfire" for the "usually reliable" Jackson and Dallas Austin. Music News called it "teeny-pop trash" and "non-descript", while Idolator added, "'Black Cat' shows she can rock, but this shows that she can't rock sweetly." Its position as the album's closing track received attention. Lisa Verrico of The Times questioned the "odd" placement, considering "Jackson’s nipple caused such a fuss, it was thought too risqué to release a sex song," deciding the decision "missed the point".

Commercial performance
Upon its official release, "Just a Little While" quickly became the most added and played song on pop radio formats. Its airplay increased over five-hundred percent and achieved "sizeable" downloads," but suffered when Jackson's blacklist was commenced by major radio broadcasters who were fined after Jackson's Super Bowl incident, affecting its performance worldwide. The song debuted at number thirteen on the Billboard Bubbling Under chart the week of February 14, entering the Billboard Hot 100 at number forty-seven the following week, later peaking at number forty-five. It reached number seventeen on the pop airplay chart, garnering a high audience impression of over 28 million during its first week at radio before removed, also charting on the Adult Top 40 and Hot R&B/Hip-Hop Songs. It was her lowest peaking single since "Come Give Your Love to Me" over twenty years prior. However, it peaked atop the Hot Dance Club Play chart.

The single performed well outside the United States, reaching the top ten in Belgium, Canada, Spain, and Hungary. It peaked within the top twenty in Australia, Italy, Denmark and the United Kingdom. In Japan it was very successful, becoming the second biggest hit of the year on Japan's Oricon International Singles Chart.

Blacklist controversy

Despite garnering positive reception and being predicted as "another immediate radio hit", the song's chart performance was massively affected by Jackson's controversial Super Bowl performance incident. Following the incident, numerous radio formats and music channels owned by Viacom and CBS, including subsidiaries Clear Channel Communications, Infinity Broadcasting, and MTV, had blacklisted Jackson's singles and music videos after being heavily fined and censored by the FCC. A senior executive for Viacom stated they were "absolutely bailing on the record. The pressure is so great, they can't align with anything related to Janet. The high-ups are still pissed at her, and this is a punitive measure." Rolling Stone disclosed:

The blacklist drew considerable attention from critics. Upon the album's release, Glenn Gamboa of Newsweek stated, "despite some initial backing for 'Just a Little While', radio and TV support for her music has withered, as the conglomerates worry about angering the FCC and Congress," in fear of receiving fines for supporting Jackson. Billboard noted that "the three singles [Damita Jo] spawned were blacklisted by pop radio". Allan Raible of ABC News reflected, "had the Super Bowl incident not happened, I have a feeling the rock-edged 'Just a Little While' and the Kanye West assisted 'Strawberry Bounce' would have been enough to make the album more of a success." Doug Rule of Metro Weekly commented, "the best tracks on Damita Jo are likely to be barred from commercial airtime," adding, "in the case of first single 'Just A Little While', never really get past go" as a result.

Music video

The music video for "Just a Little While" was directed by Dave Meyers and filmed in Los Angeles, California. In the video, Jackson films a DVD for her fiancé in a futuristic apartment setting, using five various outfits and six different sets. The video is notable for taking the innovative approach of the lead star filming themselves for a large portion of the video. Entertainment show Extra! revealed clips before a live version was premiered on Yahoo! Music's Launch. Upon its debut, The Record declared, "it’s already got the fans excited with its sexy video."

Viacom-owned networks such as MTV, considered essential for promotion at the time, refused to air the video or Jackson's later videos from her following two albums after being fined and censored by the FCC, in the aftermath of Jackson's controversial Super Bowl performance incident. Virgin Records' marketing director stated MTV's lack of support to be a "major catalyst" in the performance of Jackson's singles. Due to the boycott, the song's promotion in the United States was ceased before the video was released, limiting its exposure to international markets. It had initially been scheduled to premiere on VH1 and BET the week of March 8, 2004. It was only aired by the MTV network in Asia, where it reached number one on MTV Asia's Hitlist countdown. The video was commercially released on the song's enhanced single and EMI's DVD Sampler: Vol. 4. A live version filmed on London's Channel 4 was included on the compilation From janet. to Damita Jo: The Videos.

Synopsis
The video opens with Jackson's boyfriend receiving a package addressed to a hotel in Tokyo, Japan, containing a DVD and note reading "Love, Janet". As the DVD begins, Jackson is revealed lying in bed as she films herself. She is then seen wearing a black and red leather outfit, in addition to several red chokers. Jackson is shown in an alternate room wearing sunglasses and eating strawberries, referencing the song's lyrics. The camcorder faces the window, revealing a futuristic setting and hovering unidentified aircraft. Jackson begins to dance in her bedroom, and is briefly seen listening to a First Generation iPod. Various camcorder messages such as "error" and "end of tape" flash across the screen momentarily. Jackson's boyfriend plays a second DVD, showing her adorned in a red outfit and long ponytail while near a water fountain. Jackson depicts the song's lyrics and operates various functions on the camcorder such as "zoom". The following scene portrays Jackson in the apartment's main living quarters while drinking wine. Jackson's full midriff and navel piercing can now be seen, as aircraft are shown in the background. Jackson's three friends arrive, who proceed to film each other in various cut scenes. She is then seen lying near a fireplace as her friends are passed out on the floor. A final setting of a blonde Jackson is shown in a kitchen, unveiled in a white outfit while preparing a meal for her fiancé. Jackson's fiancé enters and surprises her with a present, revealed to be a gray kitten. Jackson shows her gift to the camcorder as various scenes are shown. The video ends with Jackson blowing a kiss as a final "end of tape" message flashes.

Live performances
Jackson performed "Just a Little While" at Top of the Pops, Channel 4, CD:UK, Italy's Festivalbar, and Ant & Dec's Saturday Night Takeaway. It was also performed on Top of the Pops Saturday, Le Grand Classement, Vivement Dimanche, McChart Show, and Les Années Tubes, in addition to Canada's Much on Demand, Japan's Hey! Hey! Hey!, and MSN. The performance from London's Channel 4 was included on Jackson's From janet. to Damita Jo: The Videos compilation in place of the original. It depicts Jackson and several dancers performing among various light fixtures resembling laser beams. The Toronto Sun described Jackson's performance in Canada, saying, "in an orange top, jeans, distressed denim jacket and cap, she blushes, giggles, chews gum and rarely breaks out of a whisper". She was described to be among "hundreds of screaming teens and a line of media photographers" during the event. Jackson initially planned to perform "Just a Little While" during an outdoor concert held at New York City's Battery Park for Good Morning America, but it was omitted from the set list for unknown reasons.

Official remixes

 Album version – 4:13
 Edit version – 4:02
 Radio edit – 3:59
 New Radio Edit 2 – 3:07
 UK Radio Edit / UK Mix / New Radio Edit 1 – 4:05
 UK Mix TV Edit – 3:06
 Album Instrumental – 4:12
 "Love Me" (Just Blaze Remix) – 4:22
 "Love Me" (Just Blaze Remix) (featuring Naledge) – 3:59

 Peter Rauhofer Club Mix – 9:28
 Peter Rauhofer Radio Edit – 3:58
 Peter Rauhofer Dub Mix – 6:37
 Maurice's Nu Soul Remix – 7:12
 Maurice's Nu Soul Radio Edit – 3:36
 Maurice's Nu Soul Mix (Edit) – 4:42
 Maurice's Nu Soul Dub – 7:14
 Maurice's Nu Soul Percapella – 6:30

Track listings

 Australian 12" single (7243 5 47896 6 3)
A. "Just a Little While" (Album Version) – 4:11
B. "Just a Little While" (Maurice's Nu Soul Remix) – 7:12

 Australian CD single (7243 8 48473 2 5)
 Japanese promo CD single (VJCP-12177)
 Japanese CD single (VJCP-12177)
 "Just a Little While" (Single Radio Edit) – 3:59
 "Just a Little While" (Peter Rauhofer Club Mix) – 9:28
 "Just a Little While" (Maurice's Nu Soul Remix) – 7:12

 US 12" promo single (7243 5 48471 1 0)
A1. "Just a Little While" (Album Version) – 4:11
A2. "Just a Little While" (Maurice's Nu Soul Remix) – 7:12
B1. "Just a Little While" (Peter Rauhofer Club Mix) – 9:28

 US CD single (7087 6 18489 2 2)
 US promo CD single (184892)
 "Just a Little While" (Single Radio Edit) – 3:59
 "Just a Little While" (Peter Rauhofer Radio Edit) – 3:58
 "Just a Little While" (Peter Rauhofer Club Mix) – 9:28
 "Just a Little While" (Maurice's Nu Soul Radio Edit) – 3:36
 "Just a Little While" (Maurice's Nu Soul Remix) – 7:12

 US double 12" single (7087 6 18489 1 5)
A. "Just a Little While" (Peter Rauhofer Club Mix) – 9:28
B. "Just a Little While" (Peter Rauhofer Dub Mix) – 6:37
C. "Just a Little While" (Maurice's Nu Soul Remix) – 7:12
D. "Just a Little While" (Maurice's Nu Soul Dub) – 7:14

 UK promo tour CD single
 "Just a Little While" (UK Mix TV Edit) – 3:06

 UK 12" promo single (VUSTDJ 285)
 UK 12" single (VUST285)
A1. "Just a Little While" (Album Version) – 4:11
A2. "Just a Little While" (Maurice's Nu Soul Remix) – 7:12
B1. "Just a Little While" (Peter Rauhofer Club Mix) – 9:28

 UK CD 1 (7243 5 47969 2 0)
 "Just a Little While" (UK Radio Edit) – 4:05
 "Just a Little While" (Peter Rauhofer Radio Edit) – 3:58

 UK CD 2 (7243 5 47969 0 6)
 "Just a Little While" (UK Radio Edit) – 4:04
 "Janet Megamix 04" (Chris Cox Radio Edit) – 4:15
 "Just a Little While" (Maurice's Nu Soul Remix) – 7:12
 "Just a Little While" (Video)

 Spanish promo CD single (JANET1)
 "Just a Little While" (Single Radio Edit) – 3:59

 French promo CD single (7243 5 48854 2 6)
 "Just a Little While" (New Radio Edit 1) – 4:08
 "Just a Little While" (New Radio Edit 2) – 3:06

 Canadian CD single (478942)
 "Just a Little While" (Single Radio Edit) – 3:59
 "Just a Little While" (Peter Rauhofer Radio Edit) – 3:58

Personnel
Vocals: Janet Jackson
Writers: Janet Jackson, Dallas Austin
Producers: Dallas Austin
Mixing: Kevin "KD" Davis
Guitar: Dallas Austin, Tony Reyes
Keyboard: Dallas Austin

Charts

Weekly charts

Year-end charts

Release history

See also
 List of number-one dance singles of 2004 (U.S.)

References

Billboard Japan Hot 100 number-one singles
2004 songs
2004 singles
Janet Jackson songs
Music videos directed by Dave Meyers (director)
Song recordings produced by Dallas Austin
Song recordings produced by Just Blaze
Songs written by Dallas Austin
Songs written by Janet Jackson
Virgin Records singles
American new wave songs